The founders of The Jim Henson Company are Jim and Jane Henson.

This is a list of notable feature films produced by The Jim Henson Company.

Film releases

Released

Upcoming

Other productions 
 Muppet*Vision 3D (1991; with Walt Disney Imagineering)
 Kermit's Swamp Years (2002; with Sony Pictures Home Entertainment)

In development 
 Monster Safari
 Lore Olympus

Notes

References